Plamen Krastev (born 18 November 1958 in Mirkovo, Sofia) is a retired Bulgarian Olympic hurdler. His best personal achievement is 13.46.

Achievements

References

1958 births
Living people
Bulgarian male hurdlers
Athletes (track and field) at the 1980 Summer Olympics
Olympic athletes of Bulgaria
Sportspeople from Sofia